David J. Valesky (b. circa 1966) is an American politician who is a former member of the New York State Senate. A Democrat, Valesky represented the 53rd Senate District and the 49th Senate District in upstate New York.

Career 
Valesky was first elected to the State Senate in 2004 when he defeated longtime incumbent Sen. Nancy Larraine Hoffmann (R-Fabius). Hoffman was challenged in a Republican primary by Tom Dadey. While Hoffmann defeated Dadey, Dadey remained in the race on third-party lines. Valesky prevailed in the three-way race. He took office as a state senator in January 2005.

In 2011, Valesky joined with Jeffrey D. Klein, Diane Savino, and David Carlucci to form the Independent Democratic Conference (IDC). On April 16, 2018, the IDC was dissolved and Valesky returned to the Senate Democratic Conference.

In the 2018 Democratic primary, Valesky was defeated by Rachel May. Valesky received 46.66% of the primary vote to May's 50.47%. All eight former members of the IDC faced progressive primary challenges in 2018, and six were defeated.

References

External links
New York State Senate: David J. Valesky
David J. Valesky's Official Webpage

Living people
Democratic Party New York (state) state senators
State University of New York at Potsdam alumni
University of Connecticut alumni
1960s births
People from Oneida, New York
21st-century American politicians
Independent Democratic Conference